Urban District (quận) known as borough, a type of second tier subdivision on Vietnam is divided into 713 units along with district, provincial city, municipal city, and town have equal status. 

The urban districts can only subordinate to municipality as the Second Tier unit. At the Third Tier, urban district is divided into wards.

History
Before 1975, in South Vietnam, all second-level administrative subdivisions were called districts, regardless of urban or rural areas. For example, quận Châu Thành, Vĩnh Long Province is in the urban area of present Vĩnh Long city, and quận Trà Ôn was the rural area of present Vĩnh Long Province.

, Vietnam had 46 urban districts. Ho Chi Minh City with 19 urban districts had the most. Cần Thơ City  with five urban districts had the fewest.

List of urban districts in Vietnam
Hà Nội (12 urban districts)

 Ba Đình District
 Hoàn Kiếm District
 Đống Đa District
 Hai Bà Trưng District
 Cầu Giấy District
 Thanh Xuân District
 Hoàng Mai District
 Long Biên District
 Tây Hồ District
 Hà Đông District
 Bắc Từ Liêm District (North Từ Liêm District)
 Nam Từ Liêm District (South Từ Liêm District)

Hồ Chí Minh City/Sài Gòn (16 urban districts)

 District 1
 District 3
 District 4
 District 5
 District 6
 District 7
 District 8
 District 10
 District 11
 District 12
 Tân Bình District
 Tân Phú District
 Bình Tân District
 Phú Nhuận District
 Gò Vấp District
 Bình Thạnh District

Hải Phòng (7 urban districts)

 Hồng Bàng District
 Ngô Quyền District
 Lê Chân District
 Kiến An District
 Hải An District
 Dương Kinh District
 Đồ Sơn District

Đà Nẵng (6 urban districts)

 Hải Châu District
 Thanh Khê District
 Sơn Trà District
 Ngũ Hành Sơn District
 Liên Chiểu District
 Cẩm Lệ District

Cần Thơ (5 urban districts)

 Ninh Kiều District
 Bình Thủy District
 Cái Răng District
 Ô Môn District
 Thốt Nốt District

References

Urban districts
Vietnam 3